Wheelin' and Dealin or Wheelin' & Dealin may refer to:
Wheelin' & Dealin (Prestige Records album), a 1958 album by John Coltrane and Frank Wess
Wheelin' and Dealin (Asleep at the Wheel album), a 1976 country album
Wheelin' and Dealin (Frank Butler album), a 1978 album by drummer Frank Butler
"Wheelin' and Dealin'" (Happy Tree Friends), a 2000 episode of the animated flash series

See also
"Wheeling and Dealing", an episode from American season 1 of The Apprentice